is the twenty-eighth production of the Super Sentai metaseries produced by Toei. It aired from February 15, 2004 to February 6, 2005, replacing Bakuryū Sentai Abaranger and was replaced by Mahō Sentai Magiranger. The program was part of TV Asahi's 2004 Super Hero Time block with Kamen Rider Blade. The action footage from the show was used for the American series, Power Rangers S.P.D.. Shout! Factory released the series on Region 1 DVD in the United States on February 14, 2023.

Story

The story begins when Banban Akaza arrives on Earth to the city of Megalopolis. He is transferred to the S.P.D. (Special Police Dekaranger) Earth branch by his commander. By that time, Agent Abrella, an Alienizer arms dealer, turns his destructive attention to Earth, helping the criminals there. It's up to the Dekarangers to stop them and bring them to justice. The S.P.D. of Earth are stationed in the Deka Base under the command of Doggie Kruger.

Episodes

Production
The trademark for the series was filed by Toei Company on October 10, 2003.

Film

Full Blast Action

 opened in Japanese theaters on September 11, 2004, double-billed with Kamen Rider Blade: Missing Ace. The event of the movie takes place between Episodes 23 and 24.

V-Cinema

Dekaranger vs. Abaranger

 was released direct-to-video on March 25, 2005, featuring a crossover between the Dekaranger and Bakuryū Sentai Abaranger cast and characters. The event of the movie takes place between Episodes 31 and 32.

Magiranger vs. Dekaranger
 was released direct-to-video on March 10, 2006, featuring a crossover between the Mahō Sentai Magiranger and Dekaranger cast and characters.

10 Years After
 was released direct-to-video on October 7, 2015 to commemorate the 10th anniversary of the conclusion of the series, the second such epilogue movie of its kind following Ninpuu Sentai Hurricaneger: 10 Years After. Eight years after saving the S.P.D. from Agent Abrella's scheme, the Dekarangers parted ways with Ban joining the Fire Squad, Jasmine marrying Hikaru Hiwatari (who had graduated in the Space Police Academy and grown close to Jasmine when he met her again after being assigned to the Earth Branch), and Swan working independently while Tetsu, Hoji, Sen, and Umeko continue working under Doggie Kruger. But after an incident occurred that hospitalized Kruger on planet Revaful wherein he was labeled as a dirty cop for an apparent dealing with the Qurlian Crime Family, which went awry with the death of a civilian witness, Tetsu takes over the Earth Branch. Two years later, joined by rookie officers Assam Asimov and Mugi Grafton, who had taken over the positions of Deka Red and Deka Yellow respectively, Hoji, Sen and Umeko encounter a Clementian named Carrie who is being hunted by Mechanoids. Once taken to the Deka Base, Carrie reveals to Tetsu that she has relevant info on the Kruger case, with Tetsu calling Ban to Earth to personally escort the witness to the Space Prosecution Office on planet Gowashichoru. Though Umeko believes Kruger is innocent, she is mortified by how the rest of his team not wanting to prove his innocence. But when Ban is ordered to return to his branch on orders from the Galactic District Police Bureau chief Kight Reidlich, Tetsu decides to have his team oversee the escort. But the escort ship is sent crashing onto the barren planet Riiyo where the Dekarangers fend off the Mechanoids before Deka Blue runs off with Deka Green following him to the Mechanoids' ship while Umeko learns that Assam and Mugi are part of the party keeping Carrie from reaching Gowashichoru as they take her to their boss. But as Umeko finds out, "Carrie" revealed to be Ban in disguise for the real one to reach her destination safely, she and Sen were kept in the dark as the rest of their team have been working to clear Kruger's death by exposing the real murderer of Carrie's father: Kight Reidlich. Once justice is served, Carrie thanks the Dekarangers and leaves while Kruger finally admits his feelings for Swan. The event of the movie take places after the final episode of the series.

Space Squad

In 2016, it was announced on Toei's press release that a crossover between Space Sheriff Gavan: The Movie and Dekaranger, titled  was set to release in 2017.

Special DVD
 is a special video produced by Kadokawa Shoten, featuring a showdown between Deka Red and Deka Break over who the better Dekaranger is.

Audio drama
Tokusou Sentai Dekaranger/Futari wa Pretty Cure is the crossover of Super Sentai and Pretty Cure series.

Cast
: 
: 
: 
: 
: 
: 
: 
: 
: 
: 
Deka Base Announcement: 
Narrator:

Songs
Opening theme

Lyrics: 
Composition: Ayumi Miyazaki
Arrangement: 
Artist: Psychic Lover

Ending themes

Lyrics: Shoko Fujibayashi
Composition: Hideaki Takatori
Arrangement: 
Artist: Isao Sasaki
"Girls in trouble! DEKARANGER"
Lyrics: Shoko Fujibayashi
Composition: Yūmao
Arrangement: 
Episodes: 17, 24, 27, 31, 35 & 39

Notes

References

External links

 at Super-Sentai.net

Super Sentai
Japanese crime television series
2004 Japanese television series debuts
2005 Japanese television series endings
Japanese action television series
Japanese fantasy television series
Japanese science fiction television series